Fight for the Dardanelles (1915) is a British silent documentary film, directed by F. Percy Smith and produced and edited by Charles Urban.

Percy Smith was known as a recorder of nature. He was a pioneer in the field of scientific documentaries. During World War I, however, he used his talents to support the Allied war effort. He shot aerial views of battlefields for British forces and made several animated films. One such was Fight for the Dardanelles.

The film uses stop-frame animation to create maps on the screen, and showed the then-current military situation in the Dardanelles, using various maps to assist understanding. Small cardboard cut-outs show the deployment of men and ships. Intertitles explain tactics, and shelling explosions are illustrated by clouds of cotton wool.

The techniques used in the film are considered primitive today; however, they satisfied a need at the time for details of the war. The film is currently available in 16mm film format.

References

External links
Info on the film at Screenonline

1915 films
British short documentary films
British black-and-white films
British silent short films
1915 documentary films
Black-and-white documentary films
British World War I propaganda films
1910s short documentary films
1910s British films
Silent war films